"(Hey Won't You Play) Another Somebody Done Somebody Wrong Song" is an American country and pop song made famous by B. J. Thomas. It won the 1976 Grammy for Best Country Song, awarded to its songwriters Larry Butler and Chips Moman.

The song debuted at number 99 on the Billboard Hot 100 on February 1, 1975. The hit song became Thomas' second number 1 single on April 26, 1975. At ten words, including the parenthetical part "Hey Won't You Play", it became the longest title of any single to top the Hot 100 up to that time. It would hold the record for six years until "Stars on 45" by Stars on 45, whose proper charting title is 41 words long due to a copyright agreement, climbed to the top in the summer of 1981. It also topped Billboard'''s Easy Listening chart, and was the last of his four Number Ones on that chart.  It also hit number 1 on the Billboard Hot Country Songs chart. Billboard ranked it as the number 17 song for 1975.

Although Thomas would not have any major country hits for another eight years, this hit song paved the way for his future success as a mainstream artist in that genre.

In 1976, the song was performed by the Muppets on The Muppet Show. In 1979, Larry Butler produced a cover version by Kenny Rogers and Dottie West, for their album Classics. Alvin and the Chipmunks and Butler covered the song for the 1981 album Urban Chipmunk''.  Butler produced the song again in 1981 on Sammy Davis' album Closest of Friends.

"(Hey Won't You Play) Another Somebody Done Somebody Wrong Song" was certified gold for sales of one million units by the Recording Industry Association of America.

Chart performance

Weekly charts

Year-end charts

References

1975 singles
B. J. Thomas songs
Billboard Hot 100 number-one singles
Cashbox number-one singles
Songs written by Chips Moman
Song recordings produced by Chips Moman
ABC Records singles
Songs written by Larry Butler (producer)
1975 songs
Songs about music